Rubén Darío Arocha Hernández (born 21 April 1987 in Caracas) is a Venezuelan football player currently playing for UD Las Zocas.

Club career
Arocha started his career in Real Madrid C, playing 4 games in which he scored one goal in that season. In 2006, he signed for Club Brugge, although he never managed to play a single game and spent three seasons loaned to several teams. The last one, Zamora, finally agreed to sign him in summer 2009.

With the squad he won the 2011 Torneo Clausura, but the team failed to complete the national title.

References

External links

1987 births
Living people
Footballers from Caracas
Venezuelan footballers
Venezuela international footballers
Real Madrid C footballers
Union Royale Namur Fosses-La-Ville players
FC Martigues players
Zamora FC players
Deportivo Táchira F.C. players
Platanias F.C. players
Atlético Venezuela C.F. players
Metropolitanos FC players
Asociación Civil Deportivo Lara players
Karmiotissa FC players
Cypriot First Division players
Cypriot Second Division players
Venezuelan expatriate footballers
Expatriate footballers in Spain
Expatriate footballers in Belgium
Expatriate footballers in France
Expatriate footballers in Greece
Expatriate footballers in Cyprus
Venezuelan expatriate sportspeople in Spain
Venezuelan expatriate sportspeople in Belgium
Venezuelan expatriate sportspeople in France
Venezuelan expatriate sportspeople in Greece
Venezuelan expatriate sportspeople in Cyprus
Association football midfielders